The Infiniti Q50 is a compact executive car manufactured by Nissan for its luxury brand, Infiniti. Replacing the G/Q40 sedan, it debuted at the 2013 North American International Auto Show and went on sale in North America in the third quarter 2013 and in Europe in fourth quarter 2013. It is the export model of the Japanese domestic market's V37 Nissan Skyline.

The design of the Q50 continues to follow the designs first shown by the 2009 Infiniti Essence concept and the production 2011 Infiniti M. The Q50 is also the first instance of a hybrid model in Infiniti's entry-level model but was later removed for the 2019 model year.

First generation

Q50 sedan (2013–)
The design was based on Infiniti Essence (crescent-cut C-pillar, deep body section, asymmetrical cabin layout, interior finishes) and Infiniti Etherea (headlights, three-dimensional double-arch grille, interior finishes). The production Q50 design was frozen in June 2011, after being designed by Joel Baek under Shiro Nakamura.

The Q50 sedan was unveiled at the 2013 North American International Auto Show, followed by the 2013 Canadian International AutoShow, 2013 Geneva Motor Show (with Hybrid and 2.2d), 2013 Dubai International Motor Show, Auto Guangzhou Motor Show in China (with 2.0-liter (214PS) turbocharged engine from Daimler AG (Mercedes-Benz)), and Victoria Harbour in Hong Kong.

Early US and Canada models include 3.7-liter V6 (333PS), 3.5-liter Hybrid (364 PS), each in a choice of rear-wheel drive or Intelligent All-Wheel Drive and in a selection of trim levels, including Sport models.

US models went on sale in August 2013.

Early Canadian models include 3.7-liter V6 (Q50 RWD, Q50 Sport RWD, Q50 Premium AWD, Q50 Premium AWD Navi, Q50 Premium AWD Navi and Deluxe Touring and Tech, Q50 Sport AWD, Q50 Sport AWD Deluxe Touring and Tech) and 3.5-liter Hybrid (Q50 Hybrid Premium RWD, Q50 Hybrid Premium AWD, Q50 Hybrid Sport AWD).

The early European models included 2.2d and hybrid. Infiniti's 2.0 RWD (211 PS) model was added in 2014.

In China the 2014 Q50 3.7L was sold as an imported vehicle until production in China could begin. The 2.0 RWD (211 PS) model and the Q50 Hybrid also joined the line up.

Middle East models was set to go on sale in spring 2014 as 2014 model year vehicles. Early models include 3.7-liter V6 and 3.5-liter Hybrid, both in rear-wheel drive.

Australian models went on sale in February 2014, launching with the 2.2d diesel and 3.5 gasoline hybrid models.

Hong Kong models went on sale as 2014 model year vehicles.

2014 Infiniti Q50 Exclusive Designer Edition (2013–)
Two specialty versions of the 2014 Infiniti Q50 sedan were produced in association with Gilt City, one designed by Zac Posen and the other designed by Thom Browne, both American fashion designers. The vehicles went on sale on gilt.com December 13, 2013 for $75,000, with a portion of the proceeds benefiting St. Jude Children's Research Hospital.

The Thom Browne 2014 Infiniti Q50 includes a chrome body finish, red, white and blue stripes from the seats to the floor mats and stitching on the steering wheel. It also features a sterling silver ring encircling the gear-shift handle and a luggage set custom designed to fit in the trunk.

Zac Posen's 2014 Infiniti Q50 includes body color fade from silver in front to charcoal in back, and from matte to shine; red-carpet interior color, shagreen handle and shagreen stick with leather piping.

The vehicles were unveiled in Infiniti of Manhattan dealership at Hell's Kitchen area.

The two buyers also received a $10,000 Gilt.com shopping credit and a style consultation, a Thom Browne Solid Silver Personal Card Case (Browne version) or a Zac Posen Smartphone Clutch (Posen version).

Q50 Hybrid (2014–2018)

Infiniti's Q50 hybrid vehicle was unveiled at the 2013 Shanghai Auto Show. Power for the Q50 Hybrid comes from the 3.5-liter gasoline engine combined with electric motor. Early European models included rear and all-wheel drive forms. Infiniti discontinued the Q50 Hybrid after the 2018 model year.

Q50L (2014–)

The Q50L has a  longer wheelbase than the regular Q50 to provide more spacious rear legroom. It is powered by a 2.0-liter turbo engine matched to a 7-speed automatic transmission. Trim levels for the Q50L sold in China are Comfort, Elegant, Sport, Luxury, and Sport Luxury.

The vehicle was unveiled at the 2013 Shanghai Motor Show.

Q50 Eau Rouge concept (2014)

Named for the famous corner at Spa-Francorchamps, the Eau Rouge is a Formula One inspired concept car based on the Q50 premium sports sedan, with aerodynamic styling treatments and design elements influenced by Infiniti's partnership with Infiniti Red Bull Racing. Changes include bespoke carbon fibre bodywork (carbon fibre front splitter, rear diffuser and side sill skirts, carbon fibre roof and door mirror casings), 20-inch lightweight forged alloy wheels, a dual-exit exhaust sports system below a large integrated rear spoiler, 20 mm wider wheel arches, red body color with overlaid tinted clear coat, matching carbon fibre door and center console panes, a high-grip sports steering wheel with Formula One-style paddle-shifters.

The vehicle was unveiled at the 2014 North American International Auto Show.

Q50 Eau Rouge prototype (2014)
Changes from Q50 Eau Rouge concept included a twin-turbocharged  (/) V6 from the Nissan GT-R and a 7-speed automatic transmission and Intelligent AWD from the Infiniti Q70. The transmission and drivelines were compromises due to the inability of Infiniti to fit the rest of the GT-R's drivetrain into the prototype.

The vehicle was unveiled at the 2014 Geneva International Motor Show, followed by the 2014 Goodwood Festival of Speed.

Plans to put the Eau Rouge into production were shelved in January 2015.

Q50 Sound Studio by Bose (2016)
The Q50 Sound Studio by Bose was a limited edition version for the 2016 model year. It was based on Q50 2.0t and 2.2d (Premium or Sport), and included Advanced Staging Technology digital signal processing circuitry, Centerpoint 2 surround sound, AudioPilot2 Noise Compensation Technology, a navigation system and 14 speakers. This was the first time Bose's Advanced Staging Technology has ever been featured in a car.

UK models went on sale in October 2015 as a 2016 model.

Engines

Transmissions

Performance (vendor specifications)

Motorsports

On 16 October 2014 it was announced that the Infiniti Q50 would be entering the British Touring Car Championship for the 2015 season under the banner of Support our Paras. At that time, PRO Motorsport announced it would enter two cars in the championship driven by Richard Hawken and Derek Palmer Jr., the son of PRO Motorsport Team Principal Derek Palmer Sr., supporting the charity Support Our Paras through racing, and its long-term goal of developing, training and ensuring an injured Paratrooper graduates through the racing ranks to pilot an Infiniti Support Our Paras Racing car.

Production
Production of Q50 at Tochigi production plant began on 14 May 2013. Production of the Chinese models of Q50L sedan at Xiangyang plant in Hubei Province, China also began in 2014.

The production of 2.0-liter turbocharged gasoline 4-cylinder developed by Daimler at the Nissan Decherd Powertrain Plant in Franklin County, Tennessee (US) began 26 June 2014. The engine is also used by Daimler's Mercedes-Benz C-Class at Mercedes-Benz U.S. International in Alabama.

Production of European models of Q50 began in 2015.

The Infiniti Q50 audio system was designed by Bose.

The Q50 Eau Rouge production was cancelled due to high cost.

Marketing
As part of Q50 Eau Rouge Prototype launch, the #InfinitiRaceFace campaign was launched 23 September 2014, awarding the grand prize winner the opportunity to attend the 2014 Formula 1 United States Grand Prix race, and also the chance to ride with Sebastian Vettel in the Infiniti Q50 Eau Rouge Prototype for a lap in downtown Austin on 29 October 2014.

2016 model year update

Q50, Q50 Red Sport 400 (2016-)

Unveiled at the 2016 Chicago Auto Show (Q50 2.0t, Q50 3.0t, Q50 Red Sport 400), the 2016 Q50 featured several updates, including the introduction of second-generation Direct Adaptive Steering with advanced levels of steering feel and feedback, introduction of Dynamic Digital Suspension, Drive Mode Selector with Personal mode, standard RACK Electronic Power Steering on 3.0t models, revised suspension settings provide an improved balance between confident handling and a more comfortable ride.

The Q50 Red Sport 400 is based on Q50 3.0t (405PS), with sport styled front fascia, sport brakes with 4-piston front and 2-piston rear calipers, sport-tuned Digital Dynamic Suspension, new rack-based Electronic Power Steering or optional Direct Adaptive Steering, leather-appointed sport seats, aluminum-accented pedals, solid magnesium paddle shifters, Exclusive Red Sport 400 brushed-finish exhaust tips, Exclusive Red Sport 400 19-inch sport aluminum-alloy wheels (staggered for RWD models), chrome finished red 'S' exterior sport badging on the trunk and front fenders.

Early models included 2.0t, 2.0t AWD, Hybrid, Hybrid AWD, 3.0t (304/405PS, 304PS models available in Middle East), Hybrid, and 2.2d. US models of Q50 Red Sport 400 went on sale as 2016 model year vehicles, including Q50 Red Sport 400, Q50 Red Sport 400 AWD. In 2019, Infiniti was testing some of its current models at the Spaceport America desert test tracks, such as its Q50 sports sedan and Q60 sports coupe.

Sales by calendar year

References

External links
Infiniti Q50 on Infiniti UK
Infiniti Q50 on Infiniti U.S.

Press kit:
2014 Q50: Canada, USA, Europe, Middle East 
2014 Q50: Europe 
Q50 Eau Rouge: Europe, Middle East 
2015 Q50: USA
2016 Q50: USA, Europe 

Q50
Cars introduced in 2013
2020s cars
Compact executive cars
Sports sedans
Rear-wheel-drive vehicles
All-wheel-drive vehicles
Hybrid electric cars